The House of the Sun  is a 2010 Russian movie about hippies in the Soviet Union. The director is a rock musician Garik Sukachov.

Plot 
The USSR in the early 1970s.  Sasha, Daughter of CPSU dignitary, after a successful high school graduation passes her exams at a medical institute and accidentally meets a girl called Gerda along with her hippie friends. She soon falls in love with the leader of their community nicknamed Sun. Her new friends are a blacksmith nicknamed Maloy, a Chilean revolutionary Juan, a long-haired man nicknamed Skeleton, and a talented artist called Korean.

Sasha's father, as a reward for entering the institute, gives Sasha a ticket to a holiday in Bulgaria, but Sasha stops the bus on its way to the airport. Her and the company of new friends take a train to Crimea. Sasha learns to drink wine from the bottle and suffers from the alienation of Sun, who’s constantly absent. In Crimea, hippies stop in a rented house, go to improvised discos and dance to rock music, which is broadcast on the pirate radio by a mysterious "Trouble Woman" (as it turns out, the daughter of the chief in the local militsiya). The hippies, as well as the Korean, are being watched by a KGB officer, who was sent from Moscow; as a result, the Korean gets arrested at the bus station when he buys the ticket to return to Moscow.

After a brawl with demobilized border guards hippies get to the militsiya. To rescue them, Sun first goes to his father, a Soviet Admiral. Here it turns out that Sun is terminally ill and needs urgent treatment in Moscow. Then he turns to the "Trouble Woman", who gives him the money to bribe her mother — militsiya officer. After the release of the hippies, on the beach by the bonfires the party begins. Meanwhile, Sun burns his cabin ("house of the sun"), which he showed only to Sasha.

Cast
 Svetlana Ivanova as Sasha
 Stanislav Ryadinsky as Sun 
 Darya Moroz as Gerda 
 Ivan Stebunov  as Pavel Kochetkov
 Oleksiy Gorbunov as Boris Pavlovich Kapelsky
 Mikhail Yefremov as Professor Victor Nemchinov
 Mikhail Gorevoy as KGB officer
 Ivan Okhlobystin as lecturer
 Chulpan Khamatova as Galina
 Garik Sukachov as Vladimir Vysotsky
 Evdokiya Germanova as head of the tourist group
 Nina Ruslanova as grandmother Olya
 Alexander F. Sklyar as cameo

References

External links

2010 films
2010s Russian-language films
2010s romantic musical films
2010 romantic drama films
Russian romantic drama films
Russian rock music films
Gorky Film Studio films
Hippie films
Films set in Russia